"Any Time, Any Place" is a song by American singer Janet Jackson from her fifth studio album, Janet (1993). It was written and produced by Jackson along with production duo Jimmy Jam and Terry Lewis, and released as the album's fifth single on May 11, 1994, by Virgin Records.  A remix produced by R. Kelly was also released. "Any Time, Any Place" reached number two on the US Billboard Hot 100 and became another R&B chart-topper for Jackson. She has performed the song on several of her tours.

Composition
"Any Time, Any Place" was co-written and co-produced by Jackson and Jimmy Jam and Terry Lewis. It is an R&B ballad. According to the sheet music published at Musicnotes.com, "Any Time, Any Place" is written in common time with a slow tempo of 64 beats per minute. It is composed in the key of C minor with Jackson's voice spanning from B♭3 to D♭5. Lyrically, the song is based on sexual liberation, similar to the music of Barry White and Marvin Gaye. Jackson sings about herself and her lover having public displays of affection . It also features saxophone and fingersnaps, with additional sounds of rain and thunder. The chorus of the song depicts Jackson singing "I don't care who's around" during her public lovemaking. According to Sputnikmusic, the song "oozes with the longing to be touched".

American singer R. Kelly made a remix of the song, which along with the CJ's 12" Mix, appeared on Jackson's 1995 remix compilation album Janet Remixed.

Critical reception
"Any Time, Any Place" received positive reviews from music critics. Jose F. Promis of AllMusic called the song "superb" and "subtle, sophisticated, syncopated, and jazzy". He also described the R. Kelly remix as a "meandering but ultimately sexy and engaging take", and "more straightforward pop and radio-friendly but doesn't relinquish its urban groove". Larry Flick from Billboard stated that the "grinding R&B ballad" benefits greatly of R. Kelly's remix, adding, "He prunes the seven-plus minute album version down to an accessible length, shining a flattering light on Jackson's writhing vocal and the song's oh-so-sexy lyrical context." Another editor, Andrew Hampp, while reviewing the album on its twentieth anniversary, called it "a stone-cold classic". Troy J. Augusto from Cash Box wrote, "Exactly one year after the release of the janet album comes the issue of one of its best tracks, this burning, down-tempo grinder. The single release prunes the original 7-minute song down to a tidy and most attractive 4 1/2-minute winner." Philadelphia Daily Newss Chuck Arnold called the song a "delicate, aching ballad", which "warmly climaxes the carnality with a cooing vow of insatiability". Sal Cinquemani from Slant Magazine noted that the song "provides a genuine climax: It's an oozing, slow-paced romp".

Chart performance
The song held the number-one position on the Billboard Hot R&B/Hip-Hop Songs for ten weeks and became Jackson's biggest hit on the chart; it also peaked at number two on the Billboard Hot 100 while it saw limited success in Europe and Australia.

Music video
The accompanying music video for "Any Time, Any Place" was directed by Keir McFarlane. At the end of the video, the screen fades to black, and a message fades in: "any time, any place ......be responsible". A remix video featuring the "R. Kelly Mix" was also released. Both versions of the video are featured on the 1994 VHS janet., while the original appears on the DVD edition of 2001's All for You, and on the 2004 DVD From Janet to Damita Jo: The Videos.

Live performances
Jackson performed "Any Time, Any Place" on Saturday Night Live along with "Throb". During the performance of "Any Time, Any Place" on the Janet World Tour which occurred through 1993 and 1995, Jackson selected a man from the audience to the stage, and sat on his thigh. An instrumental interlude of the song was included on the Velvet Rope Tour in 1998 right before the performance of "Rope Burn", where Jackson picks an unsuspecting member of the audience onto stage and teases them with her performance which included a lap dance. The performance of the song at the October 11, 1998, show in New York City, at the Madison Square Garden, was broadcast during a special titled The Velvet Rope: Live in Madison Square Garden by HBO. It was also added to the setlist at its DVD release, the Velvet Rope Tour – Live in Concert in 1999. Due to censorship laws, "Rope Burn" and "Any Time, Any Place" were left out of the release in Hong Kong, where the video was issued as a 17 track double VCD.

It was later included on the 2008 Rock Witchu Tour, as an interlude for the performance of "Discipline", on which she and her dancers pull up a male audience member and strap him into a harness; he was then suspended midair as Jackson teased him with a highly suggestive set of moves and the breathy soft-core porn of the track. She repeated the performance during the 2010 Essence Music Festival. Additionally, an interlude of the song was included on the 2011 Number Ones, Up Close and Personal. It was also included on her 2015–16 Unbreakable World Tour, sampling Kendrick Lamar's "Poetic Justice". It was later added to her performances at the 2018 and 2022 Essence Music Festival, held in New Orleans, Louisiana, which she headlined. It was also included on the second leg of the State of the World Tour in 2018. It was also included on the setlist of her 2019 Las Vegas residency Janet Jackson: Metamorphosis, sampling Lamar's "Poetic Justice" and Ginuwine's "Pony"; during the performance, a male fan was brought onstage and was sat strapped to a chair.

Legacy
Hip-hop artist Da Deputy sampled "Any Time, Any Place" in 2012 with "Private Resort". Fellow rappers Kendrick Lamar and Drake would later heavily sample the song for their hit single "Poetic Justice" (from Kendrick's full-length debut studio album Good Kid, M.A.A.D City) on the same year, which was titled after the film Poetic Justice, which starred Jackson herself and Tupac Shakur. The song's producer Scoop DeVille recalled several artists wanting the song based on the Jackson sample, including rapper 50 Cent, before he ended up giving it to Lamar. Although Kendrick asked Jackson to appear in the music video, saying it would be "a blessing" and he was "a young boy that looked up to you for years", she did not make an appearance. Jackson would later sample "Poetic Justice" during her performances of "Any Time, Any Place" on the Unbreakable Tour. A freestyle over the song's instrumental was recorded and released by American rappers Busta Rhymes and Q-Tip on December 21, 2012, where the two pay homage to the singer. A gospel version of the song was featured in the pilot episode of Issa Rae's dramedy web series The Choir. Raheem DeVaughn recorded a cover version of the song with a few lyrics changed in 2015.

Track listings and formats
US 12-inch single (Y-38435)
 R. Kelly mix – 5:12
 Jam & Lewis remix – 4:30
 "Throb" (David Morales Legendary dub) – 7:27
 "Throb" – 4:48

UK 12-inch single (VST 1501)
Dutch CD maxi single (892 565 2)
 CJ's 12-inch mix – 8:17
 "Throb" (David Morales Legendary club mix) – 9:05
 D&D house mix – 7:34

UK CD maxi single (7243 8 38435 2 7)
US CD maxi single (V25H-38435)
 R. Kelly mix – 5:13
 D&D House mix – 7:34
 LP version – 7:10
 "Throb" – 4:36
 "And On and On" – 4:48

Charts

Weekly charts

Year-end charts

Certifications

Release history

See also
 R&B number-one hits of 1994 (USA)

References

1990s ballads
1993 songs
1994 singles
Janet Jackson songs
Contemporary R&B ballads
Quiet storm songs
Song recordings produced by Jimmy Jam and Terry Lewis
Song recordings produced by R. Kelly
Songs written by Janet Jackson
Songs written by Jimmy Jam and Terry Lewis
Soul ballads
Virgin Records singles
Music videos directed by Keir McFarlane